The Newport Transporter Bridge is a transporter bridge that crosses the River Usk in Newport, South East Wales. The bridge is the lowest crossing on the River Usk. It is a Grade I listed structure.

It is one of fewer than 10 transporter bridges that remain in use worldwide; only a few dozen were ever built. It is one of only two operational transporter bridges in Britain, the other being the Tees Transporter Bridge.

History

The bridge was designed by French engineer Ferdinand Arnodin. It was built in 1906 and opened by Godfrey Charles Morgan, 1st Viscount Tredegar, on 12 September 1906.

Newport Museum holds a silver cigar cutter which was presented to Viscount Tredegar on the day of the opening, as a memento of the occasion.

Design 
The design was chosen because the river banks are very low at the desired crossing point (a few miles south of the city centre) where an ordinary bridge would need a very long approach ramp to attain sufficient height to allow ships to pass under, and a ferry could not be used during low tide at the site.

Principal dimensions
A Corporation of Newport drawing dated December 1902 is calibrated in metres. Power to propel the transporter platform or gondola is provided by two  electric motors, which in turn drive a large winch, situated in an elevated winding house at the eastern end of the bridge.

This is the oldest and largest of the three historic transporter bridges which remain in Britain, and also the largest of eight such bridges which remain worldwide.

When compared with Middlesbrough's Transporter Bridge, the Newport Transporter is  taller, but  less in overall length. This difference in weight is mainly due to the Newport bridge making use of cables to support and induce tension into its structure to a far greater extent than the Middlesbrough bridge.

Other information 
Today, the bridge is considered an “iconic symbol” of the city of Newport, particularly as a mark of its industrial heritage.

As well as a working transport link, the bridge is also open as a tourist attraction – visitors can climb the towers and walk across the upper deck for a small charge.

The bridge forms part of the classified highway network and is also where route 4 of the National Cycle Network crosses the River Usk and route 47 begins.

It was the focal point of the local millennium celebrations of 2000, where fireworks were fired from its length, and has been featured in several movies and television shows. It was the centre-piece of the Crow Point Festival in September 2006 to celebrate its centenary. It is used for charity events such as sponsored abseils.

Refurbishment

The bridge was shut down in 1985 because of wear and tear. Following a £3 million refurbishment, it reopened in 1995. Service was suspended again in December 2008 with the bridge facing a £2 million repair bill. £1.225 million was spent on refurbishment, financed by grants from the Welsh Government, Newport City Council and Cadw. It re-opened on 30 July 2010.

The bridge was closed on 16 February 2011, because of operational problems, but re-opened again on 4 June.

Appearances in popular media
The transporter bridge provided the setting for some scenes in the 1959 British crime drama film Tiger Bay, which was set in Cardiff and therefore gave audiences the impression that the bridge was in Cardiff and not Newport. The bridge also appears in an early scene in the 1972 experimental film The Other Side of the Underneath by Jane Arden and features extensively in the 1996 video for the song "Talk to Me" by Newport band 60 Ft. Dolls.

Visitor centre
The Visitor Centre is located on the west bank and features exhibits on the history of the bridge, its construction and other transporter bridges around the world. The centre has a painting of David Pearce, the former undefeated Welsh and British Heavyweight Boxing Champion 1983–1985. Pearce used to run up the steps of the Transporter Bridge during his training. The centre is generally open at weekends, but it is currently closed until Spring 2023, while extensive restoration of the bridge structure is performed and a new visitor centre is constructed.

Gallery

See also
 List of bridges in Wales

References

External links

Friends of Newport Transporter Bridge
Photo Gallery
Dimensioned blue-print drawing of Newport's Transporter Bridge
On Google Maps
Crow Point Festival – Transporter Bridge centenary celebrations
 
A collection of photographs, documents and plans relating to the construction of the Newport Transporter Bridge, 1902–06
Newport Council page for the transporter bridge
Newport's Transporter Bridge page on http://www.newportpast.com/

Bridges in Newport, Wales
Road bridges in Wales
Bridges completed in 1906
Grade I listed bridges in Wales
Transporter bridges
Suspension bridges
Grade I listed buildings in Newport, Wales
Culture in Newport, Wales
Landmarks in Newport, Wales
Transport in Newport, Wales
Toll bridges in Wales
Tourist attractions in Newport, Wales
History of Newport, Wales
Bridges over the River Usk
1906 establishments in Wales